Bingham Ray (1 October 1954 – 23 January 2012) was an American independent film executive.

Career
He was a co-founder of indie film distributor October Films and president of United Artists from 2001 to 2004. At the time of his death, he was executive director of the San Francisco Film Society.

Legacy
As noted by the Independent Feature Project's Gotham Independent Film Awards, "New to the Gotham Awards this year [2012] is the Bingham Ray Award, an award bestowed upon an emerging filmmaker whose work exemplifies a distinctive creative vision and stylistic adventurousness that stands apart from the mainstream and warrants championing. The goal is to bring additional attention to new artists whose work could be seen as conceivably joining the ranks of filmmakers championed by industry veteran Bingham Ray, who died in January."
Oden Roberts, Director and Writer, "A Fighting Season" was awarded the SFFS KRF grant by Bingham in December 2011.
Benh Zeitlin, director and co-writer of Beasts of the Southern Wild, was the inaugural recipient of the Bingham Ray Award.

The 39th Telluride Film Festival in 2013 was dedicated to him.
The 2012 film "Stand Up Guys" starring Christopher Walken and Al Pacino is dedicated to him.

The 2015 feature documentary The First Film which proves the world's very first film was made in England by Louis Le Prince is also dedicated to Bingham Ray.

References

External links

1954 births
2012 deaths
American film studio executives
People from Scarsdale, New York
Businesspeople from San Francisco
Cinema of the San Francisco Bay Area
20th-century American businesspeople
American independent film production company founders